Krant may refer to:

 (Maandblad) De Krant (formerly De Hollandse Krant), a monthly magazine for Dutch immigrants in Canada and the United States
 Gay Krant, a Dutch publication
 Our Krant, a newspaper from Bloemfontein
 A planet in Star Wars
 Battle of Krant
 A spaceship in the video game Wing Commander

See also 
 courant (disambiguation)